Zaingair is a group of villages in the Sopore constituency of Baramulla district, Jammu and Kashmir. It is the largest area in Sopore. It comprises about 38 villages spread over three tehsils of Sopore.

The main villages comprising Zaingair are ,Wadoora,Warpora,Goripora, Hathlangoo, Saidpora, Dooru, Darpora, Botingoo, Bomai, Tujar, Brath and Zaloora. Apple business is the main source of livelihood of the people in Zangair. There are numerous educational institutions located in Zangair. Agriculture University, is also located in Wadoora Sopore. Zangair belt of Sopore has long been a separatist stronghold.

References
http://wikimapia.org/11758402/zaingair-canal

Villages in Baramulla district